José Sebastião e Silva (12 December 1914 in Mértola – 25 May 1972 in Lisbon) was a Portuguese mathematician.

Silva graduated from the University of Lisbon in 1937, and in 1942 he received a grant from the Instituto de Alta Cultura allowing him to travel to Rome, where he studied mathematics with several members of the Italian school of algebraic geometry. After writing a thesis on geometric transformations that was rejected by Federigo Enriques, he wrote a second thesis, on functional analysis, and earned his doctorate in 1949 from the University of Lisbon. He became a professor at the Instituto Superior de Agronomia from 1951 to 1961, and then returned to the University of Lisbon, where he was the Director of the Centre for Mathematical Studies for 20 years.

Silva worked in analytic functionals, the theory of distributions, vector-valued distributions, ultradistributions, the operational calculus, and differential calculus in locally convex spaces.

References

1914 births
1972 deaths
People from Mértola
20th-century Portuguese mathematicians
Mathematical analysts
University of Lisbon alumni